"I Still Believe" is a song written by Doug Johnson, and recorded by American country music artist Lee Greenwood.  It was released in April 1988 as the first single from the album This Is My Country.  The song reached #12 on the Billboard Hot Country Singles & Tracks chart.

Chart performance

References

1988 singles
1988 songs
Lee Greenwood songs
Songs written by Doug Johnson (record producer)
Song recordings produced by Jimmy Bowen
MCA Records singles